Hassan Soufan, also known by his nom de guerre as Abu al-Bara, Is a Syrian rebel leader who participated in the Syrian Civil War. He was the appointed as the leader of Ahrar al-Sham and held the position from July 2017 until his resignation in August 2018. He also served as the general commander of the Syrian Liberation Front, assuming the post in early 2018.

Biography

Early life
Hassan Soufan was born in the year 1977 in the coastal Syrian city of Latakia and had fully memorized the Quran at a young age.

Pre-war activities
Soufan had received a degree in economics from the Tishreen University. He had lived in Saudi Arabia and studied Islamic Theology while there under scholars including Muhammad ibn al Uthaymeen and Abdullah Ibn Jibreen, until Soufan's arrest in 2005 by Saudi authorities and deportation back to Syria. Upon returning to Syria he was held in the Sednaya Prison and took part in a riot there in 2008 taking several guards hostage and later negotiated their released with Syrian officials, during his time in prison he associated with factions in the prison that would later go on to form al-Nusra and ISIL. A former fellow prisoner who knew Soufan  who has become an activist has described Soufan as a moderate saying he disagrees with the approaches and positions taken by al-Nusra and ISIL but does not intend on fighting them or any other Islamic factions and he is against infighting, and views issue such as Takfir as among the most complex issues in Islamic theology. The activist also claimed that Soufan's ideology is the same as Ahrar al-Sham's early leadership.

Syrian Civil War
He was released from prison in late-December 2016 following a prisoner swap between the Syrian government and the rebels, and was appointed the leader of Ahrar al-Sham in mid-2017. He has promised a revival of Ahrar al-Sham and has blamed the former leadership of the group for its decline. In 2018 he was made the general commander of the Syrian Liberation Front, a merger of Ahrar al-Sham and the Nour al-Din al-Zenki Movement which later came into conflict with Hayat Tahrir al-Sham shortly after its formation in February 2018. In August 2018 he resigned from his position as the leader of Ahrar al-Sham.

In May 2019, he resigned from his position as the leader of the National Front for Liberation as well as his position in Ahrar al-Sham for unknown reasons, he stated the reasons were personal, he also stated he was committed to fighting  and would continue to participate in the Syrian Civil War.

References

Syrian people
1977 births
2019 deaths 
Deaths by airstrike during the Syrian civil war
Deaths by airstrike
People of the Syrian civil war